Local elections in Taiwan, also known as nine-in-one elections since 2014, are held to elect local officials and councillors in Taiwan.

Types
Elections are held to elect:

Since 2014, local elections have been unified to a single vote, typically in November, held once every four years. Mayors, magistrates, and chiefs are elected using first-past-the-post voting. Councillors and council representatives are elected using single non-transferable vote.

List of local elections

2014–present 
 2022 Taiwanese local elections
 2020 Kaohsiung mayoral recall vote and by-election
 2018 Taiwanese local elections
 2014 Taiwanese local elections

1945—2014

Pre-1945 
 1940 Taiwanese prefectural elections
 1939 Taiwanese local elections
 1936 Taiwanese prefectural elections
 1935 Taiwanese local elections

See also
 Elections in Taiwan

Notes

References

 
Elections in Taiwan